"Homeless" is the 2014 debut single of Marina Kaye, the 2011 winner of La France a un incroyable talent (France Got Talent). The song was written and composed by Marina "Kaye" Dalmas with Mathias Wollo and Nina Woodford and is taken from Marina Kaye's debut EP also called Homeless on Capitol Records (part of Universal Music France). The release was accompanied by a music video directed by Hugo Becker.

Homeless EP
The similarly titled EP contains in addition an acoustic version of the song.

Track list
"Homeless" (3:40)
"Live Before I Die" (3:29)
"The Price I've Had to Pay" (Acoustic version) (4:03)
"Homeless" (Acoustic version) (3:37)

Charts

Weekly charts

Year-end charts

Certifications

References

2014 debut singles
2014 songs
Songs written by Nina Woodford
Capitol Records singles
SNEP Top Singles number-one singles
Ultratop 50 Singles (Wallonia) number-one singles
Songs written by Mathias Johansson (producer)